Birralee is a locality and small rural settlement in the local government areas of Meander Valley and West Tamar, in the Launceston region of Tasmania. Black Sugarloaf Creek, a tributary of the Meander River, forms part of the southern boundary, and part of the eastern boundary runs parallel to Four Springs Creek. The 2016 census determined a population of 182 for the state suburb of Birralee.

History
Originally called Black Sugarloaf, the name of the locality was changed at the request of locals. A mountain in the locality is named Black Sugarloaf.

Road infrastructure
The B72 route (Birralee Road) runs north from the Bass Highway through the locality, and from there provides access to many areas of northern Tasmania.

References

Localities of Meander Valley Council
Localities of West Tamar Council
Towns in Tasmania